Boichi is a pen-name used by Mu-jik Park, a South Korean manhwa-turned-manga artist living in Japan.

Biography 
Intending to be a manga artist from his childhood days, Boichi majored in physics in college as preparation to draw science fiction works, and also to learn the technology of performance and imaging. He went on to graduate school to major in image technology. In 1993, while still enrolled, Boichi debuted in a Korean girls manhwa magazine. Since then, he gained popularity releasing a number of works and publishing books on how to draw manga targeting a wide range of readers.

Manga career

In 2004 he transitioned into the world of Japanese manga. His "Ultimate Space Emperor Caesar", serialized in Monthly Comic Gum, was his first tankōbon in Japan. In 2005, 9 out of 11 of Boichi's hentai one-shot serialized in the Comic Aun were reunited under the volume titled Lovers in Winter. In 2006, he released two science fiction one-shot, "Hotel" and "Present" which, in 2008, were compiled in a volume titled Hotel along the other one-shots "It was all for the tuna", "Stephanos" and "Diadem".

In 2006, Boichi's first serialized manga, Sun-Ken Rock, was published in the bi-weekly magazine Young King. The manga spawned a side-story based on the character Yumin in 2011 and another based on Pickaxe in 2012. Another spin-off based on Yumin was released in 2012, entitled I want to feed Yumin and serialized in Monthly Young King. I want to feed Yumin is about the main character of Sun-Ken Rock, treating Yumin to traditional Korean food.

Boichi also worked as the artist of a five-volume manga titled Raqiya, written by Masao Yajima and published in 2009. He also served as the artist of the Brutality one-shot by Takeda Yuusuke in 2007.

In later 2011, he started the serialization of another manga titled "H.E the hunt for energy" in a new monthly magazine: Jump X. In this year, he won the Gran Guinigi prize for "It was all for the Tuna", about a scientist doing anything to revive the extinct tuna, experimenting on everything tuna-related and sacrificing his own happiness.

To express his sentiment towards the Vietnam War and apologize for Korea’s actions during the war, Sun-Ken Rock volume 2′s royalties were donated to the Humanitarian Services for Children of Vietnam (HSCV). He asked Korean manga artists to contribute towards drawing a support page for the 2011 Tōhoku earthquake and tsunami, giving the royalties from the proceeding to the Red Cross. He also donated the money he planned to use to buy a new car towards helping tsunami victims.

In 2019, Boichi received two awards for Dr. Stone for the Shōnen category, respectively, "Origin" for the Best Manga category.

Since 2020, Boichi is also doing the artwork for manga adaptation of One Piece novel A titled "One Piece episode A".

Japanese works 
 Lovers In Winter
 No means No
 Personal lesson full of love
 Brutality (artwork)
 Raqiya (artwork)
 Hotel
 Present
 It was all for the tuna
 Stephanos
 Diadem
 Space Chef Caisar
 
 Sun-Ken Rock Gaiden – Yumin
 Sun-Ken Rock Gaiden – Pickaxe
 I want to feed Yumin
 Eques (script only)
 H · E The Hunt for Energy
 Trigun: The Lost Plant (appears in the anthology Trigun: Multiple Bullets)
 Wallman
 Kuntwagon
 The Space Between
 Anti-magma
 Terra Formars Gaiden: Asimov
 Origin
 Dr. Stone (artwork)
 One Piece episode A (artwork)
He was there

Korean works 
 T.R.Y (Take off Rush Youth)
 Feeling
 TOON
 The constitution of Korea first amendment
 Param in the sky and the stars
 Black & White
 Metatron Diablo
 Hocus matsogeum
 Do not believe the movie
 Hotel: since A.D. 2079

Awards 
 Gran Guinigi 2011 – Best Short Story for It was all for the tuna, in Hotel (Panini Comics)
Shogakukan Manga Awards 2019 – Shōnen Category for Dr. Stone (Shueisha)
 Japan Media Arts Festival 2019 – Manga Grand Prize for Origin (Kodansha)

References

External links
 
 

Living people
South Korean manhwa artists
South Korean expatriates in Japan
1973 births
Manga artists
Artists from Seoul
20th-century South Korean male artists
21st-century South Korean male artists
Pseudonymous artists